The Emanuel Miller Memorial Lectures commemorate the British child psychiatrist Emanuel Miller (1892–1970). They began in 1972.

List

1972 Meyer Fortes, The First-born
1973 Jack Tizard, The Upbringing of Other People's Children: Implications of Research and for Research 
1974 Leon Eisenberg, The Ethics of Intervention: Acting amidst Ambiguity 
1975 Robert A. Hinde, On Describing Relationships
1976 Eric Midwinter, The Professional-Lay Relationship: A Victorian Legacy
1981 Michael Rutter, Stress, Coping and Development: Some Issues and Some Questions
1982 (9th) Jerome Kagan, The Emergence of Self
1987 P. H. Venables, Childhood markers for adult disorders
1990 Neville Bennett, Cooperative Learning in Classrooms: Processes and Outcomes
1991 Christopher Gillberg, Autism and autistic-like conditions
1992 Peter Fonagy, The theory and practice of resilience
1993 Robert Plomin, Genetic research and identification of environmental influences
1994 M. Kovacs, Depressive disorders in childhood: an impressionistic landscape
1995 J. Dunn, Children's relationships: bridging the divide between cognitive and social development
1996 M. Main, Current Issues in Attachment
1997 M. Sigman, Change and continuity in the development of children with autism.
1998 Michael Rutter, Autism: Two-way interplay between research and clinical work
2000 William Yule, From Pogroms to "Ethnic Cleansing": Meeting the Needs of War Affected Children
2001 Jay Belsky, Developmental Risks (Still) Associated with Early Child Care
2004 Uta Frith, Confusions and controversies about Asperger syndrome
2006 Femmie Juffer, Adoption as intervention
2008 Ian M. Goodyer, Early onset depressions – meanings, mechanisms and processes
2009 Michael Rutter, Attachment insecurity, disinhibited attachment, and attachment disorders: where do research findings leave the concepts?
2012 D. V. M. Bishop, Neuroscientific studies of intervention for language impairment in children: interpretive and methodological problems
2018 announcement, Sir Robin Murray

Notes

Lecture series